Salvador Hatoc "Sonny" Escudero III (December 18, 1942 – August 13, 2012) was a Filipino politician. He was Minister of Food and Agriculture from 1984 to 1986; and Secretary of Agriculture from 1996 to 1998. He was a Member of the House of Representatives from 1987 to 1998; and from 2007 up until his death in 2012.

Early life
Born Salvador Hatoc Escudero III on 18 December 1942 in Casiguran, Sorsogon. Sonny was the third generation politician of the Escudero clan. His grandfather, Salvador C. Escudero Sr., was a former councilor, mayor, provincial board member, and governor of Sorsogon. His father, Salvador Escudero, Jr. was former mayor and provincial board member from Casiguran, Sorsogon. His son, Francis Escudero, was former Congressman of 1st District of Sorsogon (1998–2007) turned Senator (2007–2019, 2022–present) and Governor of Sorsogon (2019–2022).

Personal life
He was married to educator Evelina B. Guevara with 3 children and the grandfather of Martin Escudero.

Educational life

College
Veterinary Medicine - University of the Philippines Diliman Quezon City (1963)

Higher studies
Tropical Veterinary Medicine - University of Queensland, Australia (1968) 
Organization and Management - University of the Philippines (1969)

Career history
Director of UP Veterinary Hospital (1968-1969) 
Dean and Professor of College of Veterinary Medicine, University of the Philippines, Los Baños, Laguna (1970-1984) 
Director of Bureau of Animal Industry (1975-1984) 
Assistant Minister of Ministry of Food and Agriculture (1980-1984) 
Minister of Ministry of Food and Agriculture (1984-1986) 
Representative of Batasang Pambansa (1984-1986) 
Secretary of Agriculture (1984-1986, Marcos administration; 1996–1998, Ramos administration) 
Representative of 1st District of Sorsogon (30 June 1987 – 30 June  1998; 30 June 2007 – 13 August 2012)
Host of radio program Karambola (1995-2012)

Death
Sonny Escudero died of colon cancer in 2012. He was 69 years old.

References

External links
Escudero, Salvador III H. at the House of Representatives website

1942 births
2012 deaths
People from Sorsogon
University of the Philippines Diliman alumni
Members of the House of Representatives of the Philippines from Sorsogon
Nationalist People's Coalition politicians
Secretaries of Agriculture of the Philippines
People from Quezon City
Male veterinarians
Bicolano people
Liberal Party (Philippines) politicians
Deaths from cancer in the Philippines
Bicolano politicians
Deaths from colorectal cancer
Independent politicians in the Philippines
United Opposition (Philippines) politicians
Ramos administration cabinet members
Ferdinand Marcos administration cabinet members
Minority leaders of the House of Representatives of the Philippines
Members of the Batasang Pambansa
Filipino veterinarians